John F. O'Brien (October 9, 1859 – April 23, 1927) was an American businessman and politician. He was Secretary of State of New York from 1903 to 1906.

Life and career
O'Brien was born  in Fort Edward, Washington County, New York on October 9, 1859, the son of James O'Brien. He attended the public schools and Fort Edward Collegiate Institute, and taught school for a year. Then he entered business, and in 1888 he succeeded his brother Edward in the wholesale commission flour business at Plattsburgh. In 1897, he formed with his partner George C. Kellogg the O'Brien & Kellogg Dock and Coal Company, and acquired control of the docks and waterfront at Plattsburgh, conducting the largest wholesale business of flour, coal, feed and grain in Northern New York.

He was a member of the New York State Assembly (Clinton Co.) in 1901 and 1902. He was Secretary of State of New York from 1903 to 1906, elected at the New York state election, 1902 and the New York state election, 1904 but defeated for re-election at the New York state election, 1906.

He was an alternate delegate to the 1920 Republican National Convention, and a delegate to the 1924 Republican National Convention. He was President of the Plattsburgh National Bank and Trust Company.

He died on April 23, 1927 in Plattsburgh, New York.

References

1859 births
1927 deaths
Republican Party members of the New York State Assembly
Secretaries of State of New York (state)
American bankers
Politicians from Plattsburgh, New York
People from Fort Edward, New York